The Bougainville class was a group of colonial avisos, or sloops, built for the French Navy during the 1930s. They were designed to operate in the remote locations of the French Empire.

Design and description

The Bougainville-class avisos were intended for colonial service abroad in austere conditions. Endurance was one of the primary considerations as were living conditions in tropical climates for the crew. The ships also had to accommodate an admiral and his staff as they could serve as the flagship for the overseas divisions of the French Navy. The ships were equipped with air conditioning throughout and the crew's living spaces were insulated as well. The last two ships, Beautemps-Beaupré and La Pérouse, were to be completed to a modified design with a single funnel as survey ships.

The hull was subdivided by 10 transverse bulkheads into 11 watertight compartments. Construction of the lower hull and keel were made from standard  mild steel. Conversely, the upper plating, specifically the deck, ammunition lobbies, gun shields, bridge, deckhouses and the lower part of the aft-funnel; were made from high-tensile,  bullet-proof "gunshield quality" steel. This was a chrome-cobalt-molybdenum alloy that was used in warship armour and the French equivalent to Royal Navy, Ducol ('D') steel plate armour. This provided the Bougainville with a greater level of protection against small arms and machine gun fire than contemporary French destroyers. Their crew consisted of 14 officers and 121 ratings in peacetime.

The Bougainville class was powered by a pair of license-built, six-cylinder diesel engines that drove three-bladed propellers. The ships were fitted with three diesel generators in the engine room. The Burmeister & Wain ships had , four-stroke MAN units while the Sulzer ships used , two-stroke generators from the same manufacturer. In addition, two , four-cylinder Bettus-Loire emergency diesel generators were located in the forward superstructure.

Armament

The Bougainville-class ships were armed with three 40-caliber Canon de  Mle 1927 guns in single mounts, one superfiring pair forward of the superstructure and the third gun atop the aft superstructure. The fore and aft magazines had a total capacity of 785 shells. The ships were fitted with a  Mle 1932 coincidence rangefinder that fed data to the type aviso mechanical fire-control computer.

The anti-aircraft armament of the Bougainville class consisted of four 50-caliber Canon de  Mle 1925 light AA gun guns in single mounts. They had a rate of fire of 30–42 rounds per minute. The ships carried about 350 rounds for each gun. Short-range protection against strafing aircraft was provided by eight Mitrailleuse de  Mle 1914 in four twin mountings. The ships were fitted with mine rails, one set on each side of the aft superstructure to allow them to lay defensive minefields. They could carry 50 Breguet B4 mines or a smaller number of larger Harlé H4 mines. They were also fitted with four minesweeping paravanes on the quarterdeck. The minerails could also be used to drop depth charges over the stern via trolleys; a total of 16 depth charges could be loaded on the rails.

Beautemps-Beaupré and La Pérouse substituted four or six  guns in twin turrets for the main armament of their sister ships. Their light armament was to consist of two twin 37 mm Mle 1933 mounts and four single  Oerlikon light AA guns.

To enhance the ability of the ships to patrol the large areas for which they would be responsible, they were fitted with space for a lightweight seaplane on the aft superstructure. The aircraft was intended to be accommodated in a telescoping hangar, much like the one in the light cruiser , aft of the rear funnel. For this reason the aircraft was designed with folding wings, but it was easier to leave the wings extended and to cover it with a canvas tent for protection from the elements. The ships mostly used the Gourdou-Leseurre GL-832 HY floatplane, but some received Potez 452 flying boats. The aircraft was lifted onto the water and recovered back on board by a tubular derrick, but this proved to be too flimsy to handle the weight and had to be replaced by a stronger braced derrick.

Ships

Service history
Eight of the Bougainville-class avisos had been commissioned by 1940; Beautemps-Beaupré was still under construction during the Fall of France, but La Pérouse had yet to be laid down. Beautemps-Beaupré was scuttled in the Gironde Estuary on 24 June 1940 to prevent her capture by the Germans.

The ships of the Bougainville class had varied careers that were typical of French Naval ships of the period and were torn between the Free French Naval Forces and Navy of Vichy France, with the ships of Vichy France being hunted by both the Axis and Allies at different times during the war.

On 9 November 1940 there was a rare case of fratricide between two ships of the same class when , lead ship of the class and loyal to the Vichy government, fought her sister ship , who served in the FNFL. This battle happened off of Libreville, during the Battle of Gabon. After a short exchange of fire, Savorgnan de Brazza had reduced Bougainville to a wreck and forced her to beach to avoid sinking. Bougainville later foundered in March 1941 during a re-floating operation.

Dumont d'Urville and Amiral Charner took part in the Battle of Koh Chang on 17 January 1941.

La Grandière was extensively modernised in 1944. Her anti-aircraft armament was replaced with 40 mm Bofors and 20 mm Oerlikon guns, and new anti-submarine armament of (4 depth charge throwers and 6 depth charge rails, with 66 charges) was installed. She also received two radars and a sonar.

Three ships survived the war and served during the Indochina War and in the Korean War.

Notes

Sources

World War II naval ships of France
 
Sloop classes
World War II frigates of France
Ship classes of the French Navy